Toshiaki Kitai (6 June 1924 – 15 October 1964) was a Japanese equestrian. He competed in the individual jumping event at the 1952 Summer Olympics.

References

1924 births
1964 deaths
Japanese male equestrians
Olympic equestrians of Japan
Equestrians at the 1952 Summer Olympics
Place of birth missing